Răzvan Nicolae Pleșca (born 25 November 1982) is a former Romanian professional footballer who played as a goalkeeper. In his career Pleșca played mostly for Gaz Metan Mediaș, but also for teams such as Național București, Politehnica Iași or FC Botoșani.

References

External links
 
 
 

1982 births
Living people
Sportspeople from Arad, Romania
Romanian footballers
Association football goalkeepers
Liga I players
FC Progresul București players
FC Politehnica Iași (1945) players
CS Gaz Metan Mediaș players
FC Botoșani players